Meşeler can refer to:

 Meşeler, Çamlıdere
 Meşeler, Eğil